Mohlanapeng is a community council located in the Thaba-Tseka District of Lesotho. Its population in 2006 was 9,882.

Villages
The community of Mohlanapeng includes the villages of Bocheletsane, Ha Lekholoane, Ha Mokoto, Ha Moralibe, Ha Nakeli, Ha Ramatšeliso, Ha Ramoliehi, Ha Rantsimane, Ha Tšiu, Koma-Koma, Lihlabaneng, Linokong, Liphakoeng, Liqonong, Maboloka, Machaping, Makere, Makoabating, Malakeng, Manganeng, Matsaile, Mohlanapeng, Motorong, Pharahlahle, Sehaula, Setanteng, Taung and Tlaling.

References

External links
 Google map of community villages

Populated places in Thaba-Tseka District
Thaba-Tseka District